Sylvester R. "Sal" Hall (1910 – August 26, 1988) was an American football and basketball coach. He served as the head football coach at Virginia State University from 1949 to 1953, compiling a record of 25–16–2.

Hall began his coaching career as an assistant basketball coach at his alma mater, Howard University in Washington, D.C.

Sylvester R. "Sal" Hall-Football, Basketball, Track and Field Coach- 1942-1948;1954-1964. Hall was the first African American High School Coach to take any All Black High School- the Cardozo Clerks of 1955 to the Inter-High Championships which were segregated until this time. The 1955 Cardozo Clerks played Gonzaga for the city title and the game ended in a 6-6 tie. , Hall was called the "master coach and teacher" by Dr. Andrew Jenkins, superintendent of the D.C. schools. "His contributions to young people were immeasureable-1988 Washington Post 09/01/1988/Washington Citypaper 11/27/2009

Head coaching record

College

References 
       4. Coach Sylvester R. "Sal" Hall   

1910 births
1988 deaths
Howard Bison men's basketball coaches
Virginia State Trojans football coaches
High school football coaches in Washington, D.C.
Howard University alumni